Walle is a surname of Norwegian and German origin, which is a variant of the surname Wall. Wall in turn is a topographic name, which meant a person who lived by a defensive or stone-built wall. The name Walle may refer to:

Armando Walle (born 1978), American politician
August Walle-Hansen (1877–1964), Norwegian businessman
Brianna Walle (born 1984), American cyclist
Hans Jørgen Walle-Hansen (1912–2012), Norwegian businessman
Margot Walle (1921–1990), Norwegian pair skater

Other uses
Walle (Winsen), a village in Germany
Walle Plough, a 4,000 year old plough
Walle, an urban district in Bremen, Germany

See also
Van de Walle
Wall (surname)
WALL-E, a 2008 film

References

Surnames of British Isles origin
English-language surnames
German-language surnames